Popovka is a rural locality (a village) in Mayskoye Rural Settlement, Vologodsky District, Vologda Oblast, Russia. The population was 69 as of 2002.

Geography 
The distance to Vologda is 21.5 km, to Maysky is 4 km. Marfino is the nearest rural locality.

References 

Rural localities in Vologodsky District